The Battle of Concepción, Chile, refers to all the engagements that occurred in the city of Concepción since its foundation:

 Battle of Penco (1550), an engagement of the Arauco War
 Destruction of Concepción (1554), an event of the Arauco War
 Destruction of Concepción (1555), an engagement of the Arauco War
 Siege of Concepción (1564), an engagement of the Arauco War
 Battle of Concepción (1814), an engagement of the Chilean War of Independence
 Battle of Alameda de Concepción (1820), an engagement of the Chilean War of Independence

Notes

See also
 Concepción